Miyan Jovin Rural District is a rural district (dehestan) in Helali District, Joghatai County, Razavi Khorasan Province, Iran. At the 2006 census, its population was 11,560, in 2,812 families.  The rural district has 15 villages.

References 

Rural Districts of Razavi Khorasan Province
Joghatai County